Michał Römer may refer to:

 Michał Józef Römer (1778–1853)
 Michał Pius Römer (1880–1945)